The Journal of Religion in Africa is a quarterly academic journal established in 1967 by Andrew Walls. It focuses on all religious traditions in Africa.

Notable people

 David Maxwell, editor from 1998 to 2005
 Andrew Walls, journal founder

References

External links 
 

African studies journals
Publications established in 1967
Quarterly journals
English-language journals
Brill Publishers academic journals
Religious studies journals